Aydoğmuş may refer to the following places in Turkey:
 Aydoğmuş, Çay
 Aydoğmuş, Kurucaşile
 Aydoğmuş, Nallıhan